City Hall Station is a station on Seoul Subway lines 1 (Blue Line) and 2 (Green Line). As its name suggests, Seoul City Hall is located right next to the station. Deoksugung, a historic palace of the Joseon dynasty, is on the other side of the boulevard named Taepyeongno.

Places
Seoul Museum of Art is also nearby. The museum has hosted many special exhibitions, including those of the works of van Gogh, Monet, and René Magritte. The head offices of three daily newspapers, The Chosun Ilbo, The Dong-a Ilbo and Kyunghyang Shinmun, are near the city hall. Seoul Plaza Hotel is located across from the city hall.

References

External links
 Seoul Museum of Art
 Deoksugung palace

Seoul Metropolitan Subway stations
Metro stations in Jung District, Seoul
Railway stations opened in 1974
Seoul Subway Line 1
Seoul Subway Line 2
1974 establishments in South Korea
20th-century architecture in South Korea